The People's Liberation Army Strategic Support Force (PLASSF) is the space, cyber, political, and electronic warfare force and the 5th branch of the People's Liberation Army (PLA). It was established in December 2015 as part of the first wave of the Chinese military reforms.

With an aim to improve the army's ability to fight what China terms "informationized conflicts" and enhance the PLA's power projection capabilities in space and cyberspace, the PLASSF is a new force purportedly designed to break stovepipes in the intelligence sharing and coordination departments of the different branches.

History
At the 2015 China Victory Day Parade, the Chinese Communist Party (CCP) general secretary and Central Military Commission (CMC) chairman Xi Jinping announced sweeping reforms to the structure of the Chinese People's Liberation Army (PLA) and the state security apparatus. On 22 December 2015, the Chinese PLA newsletter, Liberation Army Daily, reported that as part of the joint military exercises taking place that same year, strategic and logistical support forces were included in those exercises along with Intelligence and other high-profile units among the Central Military Commission.

On 31 December 2015, the PLA Strategic Support Force held its first annual meeting at the Bayi Building in Beijing. In attendance were the CMC leadership and leaders of the PLA Ground Force and Rocket Force. CMC Chairman Xi Jinping was also in attendance, giving out military flags and instructional speeches, along with CMC Vice Chairmen and CCP Political Department members Fan Changlong and Xu Qiliang. Fan Changlong read out the CMC's orders and decisions issued by Chairman Xi on the formation of the PLA's leadership and forces, while Vice Chairman Xu Qiliang presided over the meeting.

On 1 January 2016, the next day, Yang Yujun of the Chinese Ministry of National Defense issued a statement on the new Strategic Support Force describing it as formed by the "functional integration" of various support forces that are strategic, basic, and supportive. Another expert, Rear Admiral Yin Zhuo of the PLA Navy, noted:

Specifically, the objectives of the strategic support force were to include:
target acquisition
reconnaissance
undertaking daily navigation operations, space reconnaissance, and management of Beidou satellites
undertaking electronic and cyber warfare and countermeasures

Unlike the PLA Rocket Force, the Strategic Support Force is more dedicated to 5th Generation Information Warfare and is structured to engage in the information space, with emphasis on electronic countermeasures, network offense and defense, satellite management, and some of the functions of logistical supply and dispatch. It also responsible for influence operations, cyberwarfare, and electronic warfare.

On 24 July 2019, the government white paper "China's National Defense in a New Era" published by the State Council Information Office stated:

Organizational structure 
The PLASSF leadership and administrative officials are stationed at their headquarters in the Haidian District of Beijing; the functional departments and leadership of the subordinate units are stationed here. The PLASSF oversees all units responsible for psychological warfare, information warfare, space warfare, cyberwarfare, and electronic warfare operations formerly under the former General Staff Department.

This includes the cyber espionage capabilities of the former Third Department, the electronic support measures from the former Fourth Department, and the space-based ISR systems and Aerospace Reconnaissance Bureau and Satellite Main Station, General Political Department, and General Armaments Department, including the launch, telemetry, tracking, and control facilities and research and development organizations. It is believed to have at least 5 departments, though debate has existed in Western commentary over the existence of a possible sixth department dedicated to equipment.

Functional departments

General Staff Department 
The General Staff Department is under the direction of Admiral Li Shangfu, Chief of Staff.  His Deputy Chiefs of Staff are Major General Sun Bo and Major General Zhang Minghua. Subordinated to the General Staff Department is the PLASSF Xingcheng "Rehabilitation" Center.

Political Work Department 
The Political Work Department is under the direction of Lieutenant General Feng Jianhua. His Deputy Directors are Major General Chen Jinrong and Major General Huang Qiusheng. Subordinated to the Political Department is the Political Bureau.

Disciplinary Inspection Commission 
Also called the PLASSF Supervisory Commission, the Disciplinary Inspection Commission is led by Lieutenant General Yang Xiaoxiang, Secretary. The role of the Disciplinary Inspection Commission is to conduct surveillance and conduct "disciplinary inspections" on PLASSF members in accordance with Article 68 of the March 2018 "Supervision Law" passed by the 13th National People's Congress.  The position of Secretary was originally held by Deputy Political Commissar Lu Jiancheng (20162019). Subordinated to the Disciplinary Inspection Commission is the Disciplinary Inspection Service.

Space Systems Department 

Stationed at the Haidian District of Beijing, the PLASSF Space Systems Department (SSD) is the consolidation of all PLA's space-based C4ISR systems.  As of 2018 it is headed by Lieutenant General Shang Hong, with Lieutenant General Kang Chunyuan acting as political commissar. The Space Systems Department also oversees all of the space launch bases including:

Unit 63600 - 20th Experimental Training Base (中国人民解放军第二十试验训练基地) / Jiuquan Satellite Launch Center (中国酒泉卫星发射中心) ( Dongfeng Base or Dongfeng Aerospace City): Stationed at Bugeyin Arila in Dongfeng Town in the Ejin Banner of the Alxa League of Inner Mongolia, Jiuqian was one of the first aerospace launch facilities ever constructed in China.  Along with conducting air reconnaissance, it is the main base for testing and launching "Long March" series of carrier rockets, missiles, various test satellites meant for low and medium orbits, application satellites, and manned spacecraft. The base is also responsible for the main recovery missions.
Unit 63650 - 21st Experimental Training Base (中国人民解放军第二十一试验训练基地) / Malan Nuclear Test Base (中国核试验基地): Stationed at the western ends of Lop Nur and Nairenkeer Townships of Heshuo County in the Bayingoleng Mongolian Autonomous Prefecture of the Xinjiang Uyghur Autonomous Region, Base 21 serve as a nuclear launch and test site.  It is the home of military unit designated in declassified literature as Unit 0673.  According to Chinese public statements, the Base hasn't conducted nuclear weapons testing, but there is no way to verify.  Aside from that, it is the home to various Scientific and Technological research projects.
Unit 63680 - 23rd Experimental Taining Base (中国人民解放军第二十三试验训练基地) / Aerospace Ocean Survey Ship Base (航天远洋测量船基地): Stationed at Jiangyin City in the Jiangsu Province, the base was established in 1978 as a harbor for Yuanwang Class Aerospace Survey Ships used to track missiles and rocket launches as part of the testing of the Dongfeng series ballistic missiles.  The base is under the direction of Major General Wu Jingao with Major General Zhuang Yan as his Political Commissar.
 25th Experimental Taining Base (中国人民解放军第二十五试验训练基地) / Taiyuan Satellite Launch Center (中国太原卫星发射中心): Stationed in Kelan County of Xinzhou City in the Shanxi Province, the launch base was constructed in March 1967 under Project 3201 as a response to the breakdown of Sino-Soviet relations.  The base was constructed deep in the mountains and deliberately misnamed as part of the Chinese strategy of "backing, concealment, and dispersion". The site mostly served as a nuclear missile site and as a detachment of Jiuqian until its breakaway in January 1976. The launch center was opened to international commercial launches in the 1990s with its launch of two U.S. Iridium satellites into orbit.
Unit 63750 - 26th Experimental Training Base (中国人民解放军第二十六试验训练基地) / Xi'an Satellite Measurement and Control Center (中国西安卫星测控中心): Stationed at No. 28 Xianning East Road in Xi’an City of Shaanxi Province, the base was established in September 1975 as a missile measurement and tracking base and is now the operations and control center for China Aerospace and the backup flight control center for Beijing Aerospace. They conduct launch monitoring, tracking and measurement, as well as launch recovery.
Unit 63790 - 27th Experimental Training Base (中国人民解放军第二十七试验训练基地) / Xichang Satellite Launch Center (西昌卫星发射中心): Headquartered on the Hangtian North Road of Xichang City in the Sichuan Province. It is also home to the Wenchang Aerospace Launch Site.
Unit 63880 – 33rd Experimental Training Base (中国人民解放军第三十三试验训练基地) / Luoyang Electronic Equipment Test Center (中国洛阳电子装备试验中心): Stationed at Luoyang in the Henan Province, Base 33 serves as the metrology and instrument measurement center. They also conduct astronomical mapping and surveying. This base is one of the most restricted bases in China and was off limits to foreigners until the 1980s during the decommission of various military installations.  However, it is still in use and under the control of the CMC Equipment Development Department. 
 China Aerodynamics Research and Development Center (29th Testing and Training Base)
 Space Telemetry, Tracking, and Control
 Beijing Aerospace Flight Control Center
 Telemetry, Tracking, and Control Stations
 Aerospace Reconnaissance Bureau
 Satellite Main Station
 Aerospace Research and Development Center
 Project Design Research Center
 Astronaut Corps

Network Systems Department 

The  (NSD) is the integration of all PLA information and cyberwarfare capabilities and is believed to have taken over many of the capabilities previously held by the Third and Fourth Departments of the PLA. As of 2018 it was headed by Lieutenant General Zheng Junjie, with Lieutenant General Chai Shaoling as political commissar, both of whom are also serving members of the 13th National People's Congress.

Unit 61398 (中國人民解放軍61398部隊) / "APT 1": Stationed in the Pudong District of Shanghai, Unit 61398 is rumored to be a secret military hacker unit within the Second Bureau of the CMC Political Department.  Though it is recognized by the U.S. Government, its existence has been repeatedly denied by the Chinese Government.
Unit 61486 (中國人民解放軍61486部隊) / "Putter Panda": Unit 61486 was the designation for the Twelfth Bureau of the CMC Political Department that was caught committing cyber espionage on American, European, and Japanese aerospace companies with the intention to steal secrets.
Unit 61726 (中國人民解放軍61726部隊) / "Sixth Bureau" (中國人民解放軍總參謀部第三部第六局的代號): Stationed in the Wuchang District of Wuhan in the Hubei Province, is a "hacker" force dedicated to cyberwarfare specifically targeting Taiwan. They are directly subordinate to both the sixth bureau of the CMC Political Work Department and the SSF Network Systems Department. They originated as Unit 57316 stationed in Jingmen before transferring their headquarters to Wuhan sometime in the early 2000s. The Sixth Bureau has offices all over Central China, including: Xiamen City in Fujian Province, Ziling Village of Jingmen City and Xiangyang City in Hubei Province, Nanchang City and the Xiaobu Township in Ningdu County of Ganzhou in Jiangxi Province, and Panlong District of Kunming City in Yunnan Province. It is suspected that the Nanchang detachment is a training detachment. The sixth bureau is also suspected to be embedded in the National Cyber Security College of Wuhan University and its associated research centers and laboratories.
Unit 61786 (中国人民解放军61786部队) / "Eighth Bureau" (八局): Stationed at the foot of the Yan Mountain range, this is an information technology research institute responsible for intercepting communications from Russia and Central Asia.  In 2011, it was commended as the most talented development unit in the PLA.
NSD 56th Research Institute (第56研究所) / Jiangnan Institute of Computing Technology (江南计算技术研究所): Stationed in Wuxi City in the Jiangsu Province. Founded in June 1951, it was the first computer science and engineering research institute for the PLA. They also conduct research on network systems and communications, information assurance and cybersecurity. This is the home to China's first supercomputer, its first GHz computer, and its first 100 GHz computer. By the 2010s, the institute became the computing powerhouse of the PLA, with automated PCB production lines, CAD software development, a research library and full scale living facilities.  As of 2016 the institute employs more than 200 Senior Engineers along with graduate and doctoral students from all over China.
NSD 58th Research Institute (中国人民解放军战略支援部队第五十八研究所) - stationed in Beijing.
PLA 316th Hospital (中国人民解放军第三一六医院) - stationed in Beijing.

List of military bases under the NSD:
 Notional Base 31, Nanjing
 Notional Base 32, Guangzhou
 Notional Base 33, Chengdu
 Notional Base 34, Shenyang
 Notional Base 36, Beijing
 Notional Base 38, Kaifeng

Directly subordinate units 
 SSF Electronic Countermeasures Brigade (电子对抗旅)Little is known about this unit.

 PLA Strategic Support Force Special Medical Center (中国人民解放军战略支援部队特色医学中心)
 Stationed at No. 9 Anxiang Beili, Deshengmen Wai, Chaoyang District of Beijing, it was founded in 1971 as the 514th Hospital of the Commission of Science, Technology and Industry for National Defense.  In 1997, it became the General Hospital of the Commission of Science, Technology and Industry for National Defense.  In March 1999, it was redesignated as the 306th PLA Hospital.  After the 2015 reforms, the Strategic Support Force assumed authority over this hospital.  The hospital Dean is Major General Gu Jianwen and its Political Commissar is Major General Zhang Yucai.

 Unit 61716 - People's Liberation Army Base 311 (中国人民解放军三一一基地)Stationed at No. 15 Yuandang Street, Baima North Road in the Gulou District of Fuzhou in the Fujian Province, the Trinity Base was founded in 2005 under the control of the PLA Political Department to conduct "three wars" operations against Taiwan.  The "three wars" are "Public Opinion Warfare, Psychological Warfare, and Legal Warfare."  In 2011, the base was designated as the focal point of all psychological warfare efforts against Taiwan, including assisting in broadcasting propaganda programs thru the Chinese radio stations like Huayi Broadcasting (中国华艺广播公司) and Voice of the Strait.  The base itself is also on social media. In 2016, PLASSF assumed control of the base.  The base is under the direction of Political Commissar, Major General Mei Huabo.

PLASSF universities 

 PLASSF Aerospace Engineering University: Located in Beijing, under the leadership and management of the Space Systems Department, the university was founded in June 1978 as a "Cadre School" under the National Defense Science and Technology Commission.  In 1982, the Commission of Science, Technology and Industry for National Defense assumed authority over the school, and, in 1986, upgraded the school to Command and Technology College.  In 1999, the PLA General Armaments department assumed authority and renamed the school to Chinese PLA Equipment Command and Technology Academy. It remained this way until 2011, when the name was shortened to Equipment Academy of the Chinese People's Liberation Army.  In 2016, as part of the military reforms, the academy was transferred to the Training Management Division of the Central Military Commission, where it was rebuilt into the Aerospace Engineering University under the Strategic Support Force. Today, the university has more than 20 undergraduate majors, 12 graduate programs, 5 doctoral programs, and 3 post-doctoral research stations. The Dean is Major General Zhou Zhixin and the Political Commissar is Major General Ji Duo.
 PLASSF Information Engineering University: Located in the cities of Zhengzhou and Luoyang in Henan Province, under the leadership and management of the Network Systems Department, the school was founded in October 1971 by the 5th Radio Engineering Brigade of the PLA 1st Foreign Language School into the Chinese PLA Institute of Engineering and Technology in Zhangzhou. In January 1981, the Chinese PLA Luoyang University of Foreign Languages Department of Applied Mathematics and Department of Information Processing were transferred to the Institute of Engineering and Technology. In July 1986, the name was change to the Chinese PLA Information Engineering Institute. In June 1991, CPC General Secretary Jiang Zemin wrote the following inscription for the school: "Promote the school spirit of strict diligence, unity and dedication, and establish a distinctive and high-level key science and engineering military academy." In 1995, it was identified by the Central Military Commission as one of the 17 key construction academies of the PLA.  The following institutes are subordinate to IEU:
 S&T Research Department (科研部)
 Training Department (训练部)
 Command Information Systems Academy (指挥信息系统学院)
 Electronic Technology Academy (电子技术学院)
 Encryption Engineering Academy (密码工程学院)
 Foreign Language Academy (外国语学院) in Luoyang
 Geospatial Information Academy (地理空间信息学院)
 Cyberspace Security Academy (网络空间安全学院)
 Navigation and Aerospace Target Engineering Academy (导航与空天目标工程学院)
 Command Officer Basic Education Academy (指挥军官基础教育学院)
 Blockchain Academy (区块链研究院; located in Shenzhen)

As for the Beijing Aerospace Flight Control Center, they are tasked with conducting launch monitoring, tracking and measurement, as well as launch recovery.

Unit 63790 - 27th Experimental Training Base / Xichang Satellite Launch Center

Headquartered on the Hangtian North Road of Xichang City in the Sichuan Province. It is also home to the Wenchang Aerospace Launch Site.

Unit 63880 - 33rd Experimental Training Base / Luoyang Electronic Equipment Test Center

Stationed at Luoyang in the Henan Province, Base 33 serves as the metrology and instrument measurement center. They also conduct Astronomical mapping and surveying. This base is the most restricted bases in China and was off limits to foreigners until the 1980s during the decommission of various military installations. However, it is still in use and under the control of the CMC Equipment Development Department. 
 China Aerodynamics Research and Development Center (29th Testing and Training Base)
 Space Telemetry, Tracking, and Control
 Beijing Aerospace Flight Control Center
 Telemetry, Tracking, and Control Stations
 Aerospace Reconnaissance Bureau
 Satellite Main Station
 Aerospace Research and Development Center
 Project Design Research Center
 Astronaut Corps

Ranks

Officers

Enlisted

References 

 
5
Military units and formations established in 2015
2015 establishments in China
Chinese intelligence agencies
Space units and formations